Warszawa Wesoła railway station is a railway station in the Wesoła district of Warsaw, Poland. As of 2011, it is served by Koleje Mazowieckie, who run the KM2 services from Warszawa Zachodnia to Łuków and by Szybka Kolej Miejska, who run the S2 services from Warszawa Zachodnia to Sulejówek Miłosna.

References
Station article at kolej.one.pl

External links 
 

Wesola
Railway stations served by Koleje Mazowieckie
Railway stations served by Szybka Kolej Miejska (Warsaw)
Wesoła